Last may refer to:

Places
 Hartashen, Syunik, Armenia, formerly called Last

People
 Last (surname)

Music
 Last (Unthanks album), a 2011 album by The Unthanks
 Last (Uverworld album), a 2010 album by Uverworld
 "Last", a song by Nine Inch Nails from the 1992 album Broken (EP)
 Last.fm, a UK-based music-community website

Other uses
 Last, a 2015 South Korean television series
 Last (unit), a medieval measurement
 Last, a form in the approximate shape of a human foot, used in shoemaking
 LAST, an acronym for Local Apparent Sidereal Time
 Local anesthetic systemic toxicity

See also
 At Last (disambiguation)
 The Last (disambiguation)
 The Last One (disambiguation)
 The Last Man (disambiguation)